Pajapan is a municipality and city in Veracruz, Mexico.

Geographic limits
The municipality of Pajapan is delimited to the north by Mecayapan to the east by the Gulf of Mexico and Coatzacoalcos, to the south by Chinameca and Cosoleacaque and to the west by Mecayapan. By decree of June 22, 1889, the limits were established between the municipalities of Mecayapan and Pajapan. By a decree of October 6, 1898, Pajapan was annexed as a community within the municipality of Minzapan.

Agriculture
It produces principally maize, beans, rice, watermelon, mango and orange fruit.

Celebrations
In Pajapan, in May takes place the celebration in honor to San Juan de Dios, Patron of the town.

Weather
The weather in Pajapan is warm all year with rains in summer and autumn.

References

External links
Pajapan Tourist Guide
 Municipal Official webpage
 Municipal Official Information

Municipalities of Veracruz
Los Tuxtlas